Felix Weltsch (6 October 1884, Prague – 9 November 1964, Jerusalem), was a German-speaking Jewish librarian, philosopher, author, editor, publisher and journalist. A close friend of Max Brod, Ludwig Winder and Franz Kafka, he was one of the most important Zionists in Bohemia.

Life
Born in Prague (then in Austria-Hungary), Weltsch studied Law and Philosophy at the Charles University. He lived and worked in Prague until 15 March 1939, and left the city with Max Brod and his family on the last train out of Czechoslovakia. In what at his arrival was Palestine and later the state of Israel, he worked as a librarian in Jerusalem until his death in 1964.

He had one daughter, Ruth Weltsch (1920–1991), with his wife Irma Herz (1892–1969). They married in August 1914. The publisher, journalist and Zionist Robert Weltsch was Felix Weltsch's cousin, and the Prague-born concert pianist Alice Herz-Sommer, who performed in and survived Theresienstadt at her death the world's oldest Holocaust survivor, was his sister-in-law. His grandson, Eli Gorenstein is an actor, cellist and among Israel's leading voice dubbers.

Influence
Weltsch's works around deal with the subjects of Ethics, Politics and Philosophy. For his ethical and political publications Weltsch received the Ruppin-Prize from the city of Haifa in 1952. His most important work was the Jewish-Zionist weekly paper Selbstwehr (self-defense), which he led from 1919 until 1938. With this work and hundreds of articles he became one of the most important personalities in Jewish life next to Martin Buber, Chaim Weizmann and Hugo Bergmann, his early school friend.

Works
 Anschauung und Begriff, 1913 (Co-author, Max Brod)
 Organische Demokratie, 1918
 Gnade und Freiheit. Untersuchungen zum Problem des schöpferischen Willens in Religion und Ethik, Munich 1920
 Nationalismus und Judentum, Berlin 1920
 Zionismus als Weltanschauung, Jerusalem 1925 (Co-author, Max Brod)
 Judenfrage und Zionismus, 1929
 Antisemitismus als Völkerhysterie, 1931
 Thesen des Nationalhumanismus, 1934
 Das Rätsel des Lachens, 1935
 Das Wagnis der Mitte, 1937
 Die Dialektik des Leidens (Ha-Di’alektikah shel ha-Sevel), 1944
 Natur, Moral und Politik (Teva, Musar u-Mediniyyut), 1950
 Religion und Humor im Leben und Werk Franz Kafkas, 1957

References 
 Carsten Schmidt: Kafkas fast unbekannter Freund (Kafka's nearly unknown friend). Biography on Felix Weltsch. Publisher: Koenigshausen & Neumann, Germany 2010, .

External links 

 Selbstwehr: Jüdisches Volksblatt, a digitized Zionist newspaper edited by Weltsch, at the Leo Baeck Institute, New York

1884 births
1964 deaths
Writers from Prague
People from the Kingdom of Bohemia
Czechoslovak emigrants to Mandatory Palestine
Jews in Mandatory Palestine
Israeli people of Czech-Jewish descent
Austrian philosophers
Czech philosophers
Jewish philosophers
Jewish Czech writers
Czech male writers
Austrian male writers
Czech writers in German
Austrian Zionists
Czech Zionists
Jews who emigrated to escape Nazism
Librarians at the National Library of Israel
20th-century Czech philosophers
Charles University alumni